The Ukrainian Practical Shooting Association, Russian Украинский Практическая стрельба ассоциация, is the Ukrainian association for practical shooting under the International Practical Shooting Confederation.

References

External links 
 Official homepage of the Ukrainian Practical Shooting Association

Regions of the International Practical Shooting Confederation
Practical Shooting
Sports organizations established in 2003
2003 establishments in Ukraine
Shooting sports organizations